De vulgaire geschiedenis van Charelke Dop, (The vulgar history of Charelke Dop), is a novel written by Ernest Claes in 1923.

Synopsis
It is World War I. Charelke Dop lives in the Belgian municipality Diest. He pretends to be poor but is rather rich. After his wife Angelina dies he moves to Brussels. Charelke is a manipulative, lying, stingy, immoral but charming widower. He earns a lot of money by declaring people to the German soldiers although he is a smuggler, traitor and blackmailer. He convinces highly placed Belgians that he performed acts of valour (whilst it were only misdeeds) and thus receives medals of honour and an accompanying ceremony.

Miniserie adaption
The book was adapted for screen in a miniserie of two episodes in 1985 by the Belgian national television station BRT.

Cast
 Jef Burm as Charelke Dop
 Denise De Weerdt as Sefie
 Jacky Morel as Lewie Serezo
 Christel Domen as Trezeke
 Doris Van Caneghem as Roos
 Anton Cogen as priest
 Leo Rozenstraten as Gustaaf
 Gerda Marchand as Rozelien
 Lea Cousin as revue singer
 Greta Van Langendonck as revue singer
 Yvonne Mertens as Kermelie
 Katrien Devos as Nette Gordijn
 Ugo Prinsen as Jan Kweddel
 Max Schnur as Lamme Glas
 Emmy Leemans as Isabelle
 Marc Bober as Jan Tamboer
 Gilda De Bal as Boeboeske
 Bert André as Gille
 Dora Van Der Groen as Eufrazie
 Machteld Ramoudt as Leontine
 Anton Peters as baron Bidoul
 Gust Van Opbergen as Roger Bolders

References

External links

Belgian comedy-drama films
War film series
Drama film series
1923 novels
1985 films